Baashha is a 1995 Indian Tamil-language gangster action film written and directed by Suresh Krissna. The film stars Rajinikanth, Nagma and  Raghuvaran, with Janagaraj, Devan, Shashi Kumar, Vijayakumar, Anandaraj, Charan Raj, Kitty, Sathyapriya, Shenbaga and Yuvarani in supporting roles. It revolves around an auto-driver who maintains a humble exterior and stays away from violence, but has a dark past which he conceals from his family.

During the making of Annaamalai (1992), Rajinikanth and Krissna discussed a scene from the former's Hindi film Hum (1991) which was not filmed. The story of Baashha was adapted from that scene along with that film's core plot and key elements. Principal photography began in August 1994 and was completed in less than five months. P. S. Prakash was the cinematographer, and it was edited by Ganesh Kumar. The dialogues were written by Balakumaran. The music was composed by Deva and lyrics were written by Vairamuthu.

Baashha was released on 12 January 1995 to positive feedback and became one of the most successful films and in the career of Rajinikanth, running for nearly 15 months in theatres. Rajinikanth won the Filmfans Association Award and the Cinema Express Award for Best Actor for his performance. The film was remade in Kannada as Kotigobba (2001). A digitally restored version of the film was released on 3 March 2017.

Plot 
Manikam is a humble auto-driver who lives in Madras with his mother Vijayalakshmi, brother Shiva, and sisters Geetha and Kavitha, and would go to any extent for their well-being. He gets Kavitha married to her boyfriend, who is from an affluent family. Shiva manages to become a sub-inspector. On seeing Manikam's photo, DIG Dinakar, who interviewed Shiva, wants to meet Manikam. Manikam hesitatingly comes to meet Dinakar in his office. Dinakar suspects Manikam's identity. Geetha gets admission in a medical college, but the chairman asks for her carnal company in return for a seat. Manikam interferes and tells the chairman something behind closed doors that Geetha cannot hear, after which the chairman unconditionally gives Geetha a seat.

Meanwhile, Priya travels in Manikam's auto frequently and develops a liking towards him seeing his good character. Priya discovers that her father is a smuggler and decides to maintain a distance from him. Priya proposes her love to Manikam but Manikam does not initially accept as he learns she is the daughter of Kesavan (with whom Manikam has a past history) but eventually does so.

Indiran is a gangster who uses his henchmen to collect "commission" from all business owners. When Shiva beats two of Indiran's henchmen who attacked a man for not being able to pay commission, Indiran tells Shiva that he runs that area and his laws apply. Shiva and Indiran's fight is stopped by Manikam, who requests Indiran to beat him and spare Shiva. Manikam is tied to a pole and severely beaten by Indiran, but bears it for the sake of his brother without retaliating.

Later, Shiva again takes action against Indiran by submitting an arrest warrant which makes him furious again. This time after his release from jail, Indiran kidnaps Geetha and tries to molest her in front of the public. To everyone's surprise, Manikam hits back Indiran and his men, thereby saving his sister. The beating of Indiran and his henchmen is so severe that it shocks Shiva. He confronts Manikam about his activities in Bombay, where he lived previously, but Manikam does not respond.

It is revealed that, a few years before, Manikam lived with his parents in Bombay while his siblings were studying in Madras. Manikam's father Rangasamy was an honest man, but was employed with gangster Mark Antony, as Antony helped Rangasamy during the initial days, which made him to stay loyal to Antony for life. Manickam and his friend Anwar Baasha were protesting against the ridiculous behaviors of Antony's men, which prompted Antony to kill Anwar; Manikam was spared as he is Rangasamy's son. Enraged, Manikam decided to take the same path to destroy Antony and had killed Antony's hitmen to avenge Anwar's death.

Manikam received the support of local people in Bombay who feared for Antony, where he transformed himself into a gangster named Manick Baashha and had frequently interfered in Antony's illegal activities which created enmity between the two. Baashha's command over the city had increased, where Antony decided to kill Baashha, but Baashha escaped from Antony's plan. Enraged, Antony killed Rangasamy, prompting Baashha to help the police arrest Antony while Kesavan (who was Antony's henchman) killed Antony's family and inherited his business and wealth. Before dying, Rangasamy requested Baashha to return to Madras and start a peaceful life. Baashha assented, faked his death and secretly left to Madras along with Vijayalakshmi.

After remembering his past, Manikam learns that Kesavan has arranged Priya's wedding against her wishes, where he arrives to the wedding hall to stop him. Kesavan is shocked to see Baashha alive in the form of Manikam. Frightened, he permits Priya to go along with Manikam. On learning that Baashha is alive, Antony escapes from prison, kills Kesavan for betraying him, and also kidnaps Manikam's family members, where he threatens Manikam to surrender failing which his family members will be killed. Manikam rushes to the spot, fights Antony and his gang and also saves his family. He nearly kills Antony, but is stopped by Dinakar. Antony then steals Dinakar's gun and tries to shoot Manikam, but is shot dead by Shiva from behind.

Cast 

 Rajinikanth as Manikam / Manick Baashha
 Nagma as Priya
 Raghuvaran as Mark Antony
 Janagaraj as Gurumurthy
 Devan as Kesavan
 Shashi Kumar as Shiva
 Vijayakumar as Rangasamy
 Anandaraj as Indiran
 Charan Raj as Anwar Baashha
 Kitty as DIG Dinakar
 Sathyapriya as Vijayalakshmi
 Shenbaga as Kavitha
 Yuvarani as Geetha
 Thalapathy Dinesh as Manik Baashha's henchman
 Mahanadi Shankar as Manik Baashha's henchman
 Jayaprakasam as Manik Baashha's henchman
 Daljith Singh as Manik Baashha's henchman
 Kavithalaya Krishnan as Krishnan
 Dhamu as Dhamu
 Rajeshkumar as Kesavan's henchman
 Narsing Yadav as Mark Anthony's henchman
 Joseph as Albert, Mark Anthony's henchman
 Vittal Rao as Kavitha's father-in-law -->
 Sethu Vinayagam as the college chairman
 Alphonsa (special appearance in the song "Ra Ra Ramaiah")
 Hemalatha as Mark Antony's daughter

Production

Development 
During the making of the Hindi film Hum (1991), its director Mukul S. Anand had considered and discussed with Rajinikanth a potential scene, where Shekhar (Amitabh Bachchan) would help his younger brother Vijay (Govinda) get a seat in the Police Academy. Anand discarded the scene because he did not find it suitable, but Rajinikanth felt it had the potential to develop into a script for a feature film. On the sets of Annaamalai (1992), Rajinikanth and its director Suresh Krissna discussed the scene, which Krissna also found to be interesting. The title Baashha was suggested by Rajinikanth to Krissna, who suggested to Rajinikanth that a Muslim connection to the script was needed.

Krissna brought up the subject again to Rajinikanth during the making of Veera (1994), but Rajinikanth wanted to discuss the script only after completing Veera. The discarded scene from Hum became the foundation for Baashha where Rajinikanth's character in the film, Manikkam, helps his sister Geetha (Yuvarani) get admission to the medical college she had applied for. Krissna planned to weave the rest of the film's story around the scene. Though Manikkam was initially considered to be written as a bus conductor, the "auto driver was the commonest man around. And Rajini liked the idea".

R. M. Veerappan, who had earlier collaborated with Rajinikanth in Ranuva Veeran (1981), Moondru Mugam (1982), Thanga Magan (1983), Oorkavalan (1987) and Panakkaran (1990), was the film's co-producer, along with V. Rajammal and V. Thamilazhagan. Development regarding the film's script commenced in the Taj Banjara hotel in Hyderabad. Eighty percent of the script, including the flashback portions of Rajinikanth as Baashha, were ready in ten days. Balakumaran was selected to write the film's dialogues. The entire team of technicians who had worked with Krissna in Annaamalai, including music composer Deva, returned to work with him for Baashha.

Casting and filming 
Nagma was the first and only choice for the role of the heroine Priya after Krissna was impressed with her performance in Kadhalan (1994). Krissna considered some Bollywood names for the role of the antagonist Mark Antony, but nothing worked out. He then thought Raghuvaran would be a good fit, considering his tall height and deep voice. Rajinikanth also readily agreed to this proposal. Krissna met Raghuvaran at his residence and explained the role. Raghuvaran was excited and agreed to play Antony. According to Charan Raj, who played Anwar Baashha, Mammootty was the original choice for that role. Anandaraj was approached for an undisclosed role, later revealed to be Indiran; Rajinikanth told him the role required him to beat Manikkam who is tied to a pole, and Anandaraj agreed. According to Anandaraj, he was approached 10 days before filming ended.

Principal photography began in August 1994, and was completed in less than five months. The muhurat shot took place at AVM Studios at the venue which later came to be known as the Rajni Pillaiyar Temple. Fans of Rajinikanth were invited for the shot. Choreography for the song "Naan Autokaaran" was done by Tarun Kumar, whose father Hiralal was also a dance choreographer. Rajinikanth recommended Tarun to Krissna, who had initially wanted Raghuram to choreograph the song. Tarun completed the choreography in five days and the entire sequence was rehearsed at AVM Studios with fifty back-up dancers. As in the song "Vandhenda Paalakaaran" from Annamalai, the sequence was shot with Rajinikanth looking into the lens with a smile, which was intended to make the audience feel that he was looking directly at them and then putting his hands together to greet them. The gesture, which was already effective in Annamalai, prompted Krissna to extend the screen time of the shot. Krissna wanted Rajinikanth to sport a dress that would make him look slightly unkempt in appearance, but Rajinikanth finished the sequence in a smartly-tailored uniform and told Krissna that the audience would not find it odd. The filming of the song took place at the open space at Vijaya Vauhini Studios in Madras, the same area where Hotel Green Park is present; the song was completed with a hundred back-up dancers used for it in four days. Choreographers Kalyan and Ashok Raj were part of the back-up dancers for the song.

In one of the action sequences involving the protagonist in a face-off against the antagonist's henchmen, the dialogue Naan oru thadava sonna, nooru thadava sonna madhiri (Saying it once is equal to my saying it a hundred times) is spoken. The first half of the film was shot for twenty-three days at a stretch. Regarding the dialogue's development, Rajinikanth told Balakumaran that the dialogue had to be simple yet effective, as it would be used in a sequence where another side of the protagonist was revealed. On the day when the sequence which featured the dialogue was to be shot, Rajinikanth came up with the dialogue, which was originally spoken by him as Naan oru vaatti sonna, nooru vaatti sonna madhiri, which impressed Balakumaran and Krissna. Before the take, Rajinikanth, who repeatedly rehearsed the dialogue, told Krissna that the word "thadava" sounded more effective than "vaatti", and suggested Krissna use "thadava" instead of "vaatti". Balakumaran initially disagreed with Rajinikanth and Krissna as he felt that "vaatti" was fine and did not need changing. Rajinikanth then spoke both the versions of the dialogue and convinced Balakumaran to change "vaatti" to "thadava". The dialogue had such an impact on everyone present at the set that, in the break that followed, everyone started using it one way or another. The dialogues occur only five times in the film. The scene where Manikkam gets beaten up to protect his sibling and the following sequence where he beats up the antagonist in turn, was suggested to Krissna by Raju, the choreographer for both the stunt sequences.

Ramalingam, the son of R. M. Veerappan, informed Krissna that Veerappan wanted to meet him. Krissna had finished shooting the sequence where Manikkam gets beaten up by Indiran after trying to protect his younger brother Shiva (Shashi Kumar). When Veerappan enquired Krissna about how the film was shaping up, Krissna spoke about the scene which he had shot before his meeting with Veerappan. Veerappan wanted the scene to be deleted as he felt that people would not want to see an actor like Rajinikanth getting beaten up. Rajinikanth offered to show a sneak preview of the film to Veerappan on 15 December 1994, and if Veerappan did not want the scene to be in the film, the scene would be re-shot, and Rajinikanth offered to bear the costs for re-shooting the scene himself. The shooting was stalled for five days after Krissna's meeting with Veerappan. Later, Krissna, Raju, the choreographer for the stunt sequence, and cameraman Prakash concluded that the scene would be tweaked in such a way that it would be as if Mother Nature is angry at the treatment being meted out to a peace-loving person like Manikkam; it was also planned that backlighting and a poignant background music would be used as well. Twenty-five scenes, including those which show Manikkam's house and neighborhood were shot at Vijaya Vauhini Studios. The set at the studio was designed by Magie, the film's art director. The set also consisted of a tea stall, a cycle stand, and a theatre. The scenes featuring the comedy sequences, interludes featuring Nagma, and some of the action sequences featuring Anandaraj were also filmed at Vijaya Vauhini Studios. Krissna wanted to complete the scenes scheduled to be filmed there before dismantling the sets.

Music 
The film's soundtrack was composed by Deva, with lyrics by Vairamuthu. Due to the popularity of the rap genre at that time, Deva and Krissna wanted the introduction song to be in the Boney M. group style of music, but the method was not successful. Deva then tried the gaana genre and sang a few lines to Krissna: "Kappal paaru, kappal paaru, Kappal meledora paaru, Dora kezhey aaya paaru, Aaya kayila kozhandahai paaru" (See the ship sailing, See the Englishman on it, also see the poor native woman on board, with a baby in her arms). This tune, originally done by Deva, laid the foundation for the song, "Naan Autokaaran". After Rajinikanth and Vairamuthu heard Deva's rendition, Vairamuthu wrote the lyrics for the song in ten minutes. Recording for the song was done by Deva in collaboration with Sabesh–Murali. Vairamuthu completed the lyrics of the song "Ra Ra Ramaiya" in eight minutes.

The song "Style Style Thaan" is partly based on the James Bond Theme. The song "Azhagu" is based on the Hindi song "Dilbar Dil Se Pyaare", composed by R. D. Burman for Caravan (1971). The theme music of Baashha is based on the theme of Terminator 2: Judgment Day (1991), while a sample of Enigma's "Carly's Song" was used as the theme of Mark Anthony. The soundtrack was a large success, and all the numbers were chartbusters. A special function was held at Hotel Chola Sheraton to celebrate the success of the film's soundtrack. Rajinikanth was presented a platinum disc on the occasion.

Release 
Baashha was released theatrically on 12 January 1995, two days before Pongal. It was released with 18 prints in North Arcot, South Arcot and Chengalpet areas. The film was a major success, and took nearly 15 months to complete its entire theatrical run. For his performance, Rajinikanth won the Filmfans Association Award and the Cinema Express Award for Best Actor.

Reception 
On 13 January 1995, a review from The Hindu said, "Rajini blossoms fully to portray two different characters, a former dada of Bombay and a docile peace-loving auto driver in Tamil Nadu, trying not to fall back on his old ways and finding it difficult to do so when force of circumstances pressure him" and that Suresh Krishna "has fashioned his screenplay to suit the image of Rajini and the taste of his fans and the songs and sequences are fashioned to boost the image of the hero". On 23 January, K. Vijiyan of the New Straits Times said "If you are not a Rajini fan, go without expecting too much and you may not be disappointed". On 29 January, Ananda Vikatan said the director had intelligently created scenes to present Rajinikanth with full honour, also noting that Rajinikanth had taken the majestic form in the film through his acting and action sequences, and that made the film a treat to watch. Balaji T.K. of INDOlink wrote, "A mass entertainer which will have Rajini's fans cheering lustily at his every move, as everything he does is tailored to receive an applause from his fans." R. P. R. of Kalki wrote that fans had come to a stage where they enjoy whatever Rajinikanth does, and encouraged the director to try something different next time.

Legacy 

Baashha attained cult status in Tamil cinema, and was remade in Kannada as Kotigobba (2001). In May 2007, K. Balamurugan of Rediff.com ranked the film tenth in his list of "Rajni's Tamil Top 10" films. In October 2008, Outlook included Rajinikanth's dialogue "" in its list, "13 Cheesiest, Chalkiest Lines in Indian Cinema". The line was also used in "The Punch Song", a song from the film, Aaha Kalyanam (2014). When stand-up comedian and television anchor Bosskey launched a play titled Dada (Don) in October 2005, he named the cast after famous characters in Tamil films. Accordingly, Anniyan (one of Vikram's characters in the film), Baasha (Rajinikanth's character in the film) and Velu Nayakkar (Kamal Haasan's role in Nayakan) play the central characters of a family of brothers.

A dialogue from the film, "Enakku Innoru Per Irukku" (I have another name) was used as the title of a 2016 film, while other films titled Antony (2018) and Maanik (2019) inspired by the lead characters were also released. A further film titled Mark Antony by Adhik Ravichandran is in production, as of 2022. In 2002, the Telugu film Khadgam was dubbed and released in Tamil as Thiru Manick Baasha. In 2008, the Malayalam film Big B was dubbed and released in Tamil as Maanik Baasha. The rivalry between Manik Baasha and Mark Antony became iconic, and was referenced in the song "Engadi Porandha" from Vanakkam Chennai (2013). After the release of Padayappa (1999), Rajinikanth and Suresh Krissna discussed the possibility of making a sequel to Baashha. Ultimately, they felt that Baashha was inimitablenot even a sequel could equal it.

Re-releases 
The Hindi-dubbed version of Baashha was released on 25 May 2012, after being digitally restored. A digitally restored version of the Tamil original was released on 3 March 2017.

Notes

References

Bibliography

External links 

 

1990s Tamil-language films
1995 action films
1995 films
Films about organised crime in India
Films directed by Suresh Krissna
Films scored by Deva (composer)
Films set in Mumbai
Films shot in Mumbai
Indian action films
Indian gangster films
Indian nonlinear narrative films
Tamil films remade in other languages